Nimettömiä lauluja is a 1918 poetry collection by Finnish poet Aaro Hellaakoski. The poems use satirical tones reflecting feelings of inadequacy and loneliness.

Extract

An extract of the middle stanza in part V:

External links and sources
 
 / Nimettömiä lauluja poetry book

1918 poetry books
Finnish poetry collections